Žiga Lipušček (born 5 January 1997) is a Slovenian football defender who plays for Rigas FS.

Personal life
In August 2016, Lipušček was involved in a car crash that killed two of his Maribor B teammates, while the third one suffered serious injuries and had to retire. Lipušček, however, suffered only minor injuries.

References

External links
Žiga Lipušček at NZS 

1997 births
Living people
People from Šempeter pri Gorici
Slovenian footballers
Slovenia youth international footballers
Slovenia under-21 international footballers
Association football defenders
NK Maribor players
ND Gorica players
FK RFS players
Slovenian expatriate footballers
Expatriate footballers in Latvia
Slovenian expatriate sportspeople in Latvia
Slovenian PrvaLiga players
Slovenian Second League players
Latvian Higher League players